Aspidosperma triternatum is a species of plant in the family Apocynaceae. It is found in Argentina and Paraguay.

References

triternatum
Near threatened plants
Taxonomy articles created by Polbot